TOP gogo, season 1 was the first season of TOP gogo. It premiered on May 13, 2012 and featured 13 contestants. The show began to air in May. However, after the competition was down to the last three contestants, the show took a temporary break and stopped airing. The finale aired some months later in October where the progress and final adventures of the top 3 in London was shown. Twenty-two-year-old Tako Mandaria was declared the winner of the competition. She would later on go to sue the producers of the show because she did not receive all of her prizes.

Contestants
(ages stated are at start of contest)

Summaries

Call-out order

 The contestant was eliminated
 The contestant was disqualified
 The contestant was part of a non-elimination bottom two
 The contestant quit the competition
 The contestant won the competition

 In episode 2, Tako, Tamo, and Tatia landed in the bottom three. Tako was saved, while Tamo and Tatia were eliminated.
 In episode 3, Keti and Guranda landed in the bottom two. Neither of them was eliminated. Instead, Sopo C. was disqualified for contacting her boyfriend via the Internet, which was against the show's rules.
 In episode 4, Naniko and Renata landed in the bottom two. Neither of them was eliminated due to Liza's decision to withdraw from the show.
 In episodes 7, 10, and 12 there were no eliminations, and all the contestants were put through collectively to the next episode.

Photo shoot guide
Episode 1 photo shoot: AVTANDIL dresses
Episode 2 photo shoot: Natural beauty shots
Episode 3 photo shoot: Posing in a sports shop
Episode 4 photo shoot: Neanderthal hunters
Episode 5 photo shoot: Queen Jewelry campaign 
Episode 6 photo shoot: Replay denim campaign
Episode 7 photo shoot: Posing nude with snakes and flowers
Episode 8 photo shoot: Iverioni'' calendar editorial
Episode 9 photo shoot: Posing underwater
Episode 10 photo shoot: B&W on an old fishing vessel
Episode 11 photo shoot: Gothic style
Episode 12 photo shoot: Professional modeling test shots

References

2012 television seasons
Modeling-themed television series